Lord Macdonald may refer to:
 The High Chief of the Scottish Clan Donald
 Baron Macdonald in the Peerage of Ireland
 Ken Macdonald, Baron Macdonald of River Glaven, QC